The Acqua Santa Golf Club Course is an Italian golf course located along the Appian Way southeast of Rome.

Constructed in 1903, it hosted the running portion of the modern pentathlon events for the 1960 Summer Olympics.

References
1960 Summer Olympics official report. Volume 2, Part 2. p. 664.
Worldgolf.com profile.

External links 

 Official Website 

1903 establishments in Italy
Venues of the 1960 Summer Olympics
Olympic modern pentathlon venues
Golf clubs and courses in Italy